Ust-Kamchatsk Airport  is an airport in Kamchatka Krai, Russia located ten kilometers east of Ust-Kamchatsk. It is a medium-sized airfield handling small transport planes.  The taxiway and apron configurations suggest possible military use in past, though the substandard runway length suggests it is not of significant military importance.

Airlines and destinations

References
RussianAirFields.com

Soviet Air Force bases
Airports built in the Soviet Union
Airports in Kamchatka Krai